Xylota florum is a Palearctic species of hoverfly.

Description
External images
For terms see Morphology of Diptera Wing length 6 ·25-9 ·25 mm. Abdomen black with elongate yellow spots. Hind tibiae pale on basal third. Antero-dorsal hairs on the hind femora including many at least as long as half the depth of the hind femur, these longer hairs present on more than half  the femur length. Anterior anepisternum dull, posterior anepisternum shiny. The male genitalia are figured by Hippa (1968). The larva is  described by Rotheray (2004).

See references for determination.

Distribution
Palearctic Fennoscandia South to central France. Ireland eastwards Europe into Russia and the Caucasus then to Siberia.

References

Diptera of Europe
Eristalinae
Taxa named by Johan Christian Fabricius
Insects described in 1805